The men's slopestyle competition in freestyle skiing at the 2022 Winter Olympics was held on 14 February (qualification) and 16 February (final), at the Genting Snow Park in Zhangjiakou. Alex Hall  of the United States won the event, which was his first Olympic medal. The 2018 silver medalist, Nick Goepper, also of the United States, won silver again. Jesper Tjäder  of Sweden was third, also his first Olympic medal.

The 2018 champion is Øystein Bråten, but he stopped competing and was not available to defend the title. The bronze medalist, Alex Beaulieu-Marchand, did not qualify. At the 2021–22 FIS Freestyle Ski World Cup, there were only three races held before the Olympics, and Fabian Bösch was leading the rankings. Goepper is the 2021 X-Games winner, and Andri Ragettli is the 2021 world champion.

Qualification

A total of 30 athletes qualified to compete at the games. For an athlete to compete they must have a minimum of 50.00 FIS points on the FIS Points List on January 17, 2022 and a top 30 finish in a World Cup event or at the FIS Freestyle Ski World Championships 2021 in either big air or slopestyle. A country could enter a maximum of four athletes into the event.

Results

Qualification
 Q — Qualified for the Final

The top 12 athletes in the qualifiers moved on to the medal round.

Final

References

Men's freestyle skiing at the 2022 Winter Olympics